Valfornace is a comune (municipality) in the Province of Macerata in the Italian region Marche.

It was established on 1 January 2017 by the merger of Fiordimonte and Pievebovigliana.

References

Cities and towns in the Marche